Nilakandaeshwarar Temple was constructed by Karikala Chola in 433 AD near Noyyal river in Irugur, Coimbatore, Tamil Nadu, India. The temple's main god was Shiva, along with Nanthi and Parvati.

Hindu temples in Coimbatore district
5th-century Hindu temples
Chola architecture